Futari wa Pretty Cure Max Heart is the second season of Futari wa Pretty Cure and the second Pretty Cure anime television series. The story continues from the first season; Nagisa Misumi and Honoka Yukishiro reacquire the power of Pretty Cure, and are joined by a new girl, Hikari Kujou, who can transform into Shiny Luminous form. Together, the trio start a new adventure to collect the Heartiels to resurrect the Queen of Light. The season aired in Japan from February 6, 2005 to January 29, 2006, replacing the first season in its initial timeslot and was succeeded by Futari wa Pretty Cure Splash Star. The opening theme is "Danzen! Futari wa Pretty Cure (Max Heart ver.)" (DANZEN!ふたりはプリキュア (ver. MaxHeart)?) by Mayumi Gojo. The first ending theme, used for episodes 1-36, is "Muri Muri!? Ari Ari!! In jaa Na~i?!" (ムリムリ!?ありあり!!INじゃあな～い?!?, "No way!? Unbeliveable!! Is that Okay?!") by Mayumi Gojo with Young Fresh, whilst the second ending theme, used for episodes 37-47 is "Wonder Winter Yatta" (ワンダーウィンターヤッタ Wandā Wintā Yatta?, "Wonder Winter Alright") by Gojo.


Episode list
{|class="wikitable"
|- style="border-bottom: 3px solid #CCF;"
! style="width:1%;"  | 
! Title
! style="width:14%;" | Original air date
|-

|}

See also

Futari wa Pretty Cure Max Heart the Movie and Futari wa Pretty Cure Max Heart the Movie 2: Friends of the Snow-Laden Sky - Two animated films based on the series.

References 
General
 http://asahi.co.jp/precure/

Pretty Cure episode lists

es:Anexo:Episodios de Futari wa Pretty Cure